Sue Tilley (born 1957), also known as Big Sue, is a British artist's model and writer. She modelled for painter Lucian Freud.

Born in south London, Tilley worked for performance artist and club promoter Leigh Bowery as a cashier at his "Taboo" night club. Bowery introduced her to Lucian Freud in 1990 and she began posing for him the following year. During this time, she was also a full-time benefits supervisor at the Charing Cross jobcentre, a state-operated employment agency, and she eventually became manager there.

Freud painted several large nude portraits of Tilley, the first being  (1993). Benefits Supervisor Sleeping, painted in 1995, was sold at auction in 2008 for £17 million ($33.6 million US) in New York City. In 2015, the 1994 painting Benefits Supervisor Resting sold for £35 million ($56 million US). A fourth painting Sleeping by the Lion Carpet was painted in 1996. Freud also produced a number of etchings featuring Tilley, including Woman with an Arm Tattoo which Tilley sold in 2005.

In 1997, she published Leigh Bowery: The life and times of an Icon, a biography.

From September 2000 to March 2001, Chief Curator Rolf Lauter at Museum für Moderne Kunst Frankfurt could realise the only overview exhibition of Freud's works in a German museum in close cooperation with the artist. Both the catalog and the invitation as well as the poster included Freud's painting Sleeping by the Lion Carpet from 1995/96 with Sue Tilley.

In 2015, she had a solo show of paintings and drawings in a London gallery. She did a collaboration with Fendi to decorate luxury clothes and bags with her pictures of desk lamps, bottle openers, banana skins, cups of coffee.

In September 2021 Tilley was a guest on the BBC Radio 4 show Saturday Live.

References 

1957 births
Living people
English biographers
English artists' models
English civil servants